La Dame Blanche (French) was the codename for an underground intelligence network which operated in German-occupied Belgium during World War I. It took its name from a German legend which stated that the fall of the Hohenzollern dynasty would be announced by the appearance of a woman wearing white.

The network provided information on German troop movements by watching the railway system.

The decision resulted from the arrest and execution of Dewé's cousin, who had himself founded an intelligence network codenamed "Lambrecht". In order to save the group, Dewé took control and developed it under the name Dame Blanche with his friend Herman Chauvin. 

The network was at first affiliated to the British military intelligence service of Cecil Aylmer Cameron via Folkestone. After constant infiltration by agents working for Colonel Walter Nicolai and Abteilung III b, the German counterintelligence service, La Dame Blanche transferred its allegiance to the British Secret Service (later known as MI6) station in Rotterdam, where their new handler was Captain Henry Landau. After the end of the war, Mansfield Smith-Cumming, head of the Secret Service, estimated that Dame Blanche had supplied as much as 70 percent of all military intelligence collected by Allied intelligence services world-wide, not merely that from German-occupied Belgium and northern France.

By the end of the war, its 1,300 agents covered all of occupied Belgium, northern France and – through a collaboration with Louise de Bettignies' network – occupied Luxembourg. The network was known for its high proportion of female members; women may have made up as much as 30 percent of its total personnel.

During the second German occupation of Belgium in World War II, Dewé used the experience of the Dame Blanche network to start a new network, codenamed Clarence, to which several former members of Dame Blanche belonged. He was shot and killed while trying to avoid capture by the Germans in January 1944.

A monument to the Dame Blanche resistance organisation has been built near the city of Liège. It is the Chapelle Saint-Maurice (mémorial Walthère Dewé), Rue Coupée 94, Liège, Belgium.

References

Further reading

 

 Landau, Henry. Secrets of the White Lady . New York: G.P. Putnam's & Sons, 1935.
 Proctor, Tammy M. Female Intelligence: Women and Espionage in the First World War. New York and London: New York University Press, 2003. 205 pp. .
 Ruis, Edwin. Spynest. British and German Espionage from Neutral Holland 1914–1918. Briscombe: The History Press, 2016. .

External links
La Dame Blanche at 1914–1918 Online Encyclopedia.

German occupation of Belgium during World War I
Luxembourg in World War I
1916 establishments in Belgium
Resistance movements
World War I spies for the United Kingdom